Menteur is the second album of the French singer Cali, released October 10, 2005. All songs are written and sung by Cali with the exception of track 12 (Bruno Caliciuri and Julien Lebart). Always in search of L'amour parfait (the perfect love), this new protest album deals with children caught in the middle of divorce: abuses, individual rights, and the emotions of all parties involved.

Track listings

Qui se soucie de moi 03:30
Je m’en vais (après Miossec) 03:51
Pauvre garçon avec Daniel Darc 05:08
Pour Jane 03:07
Je sais 04:39
Je ne vivrai pas sans toi 03:43
Roberta 06:42
Menteur 04:42
Tes yeux 04:50
La fin du monde pour dans dix minutes 04:13
Je te souhaite à mon pire ennemi 04:22
Le vrai père 05:26

External links
Official Site
Cali fan website
Fan website
Musilac

References
This article uses information from the French language website Musilac.

2005 albums